The 11th African Championships in Athletics were held in Dakar, Senegal, from August 18 to August 22 at the Stade Léopold Senghor.

Men's results

Track

Field

Women results

Track

Field

Medal table

See also
1998 in athletics (track and field)

External links
Results - GBR Athletics

A
African Championships in Athletics
A
African Championships in Athletics
20th century in Dakar
Sports competitions in Dakar
Athletics competitions in Senegal